The women's 100 metres hurdles event at the 1985 Summer Universiade was held at the Kobe Universiade Memorial Stadium in Kobe on 2 and 3 September 1985.

Medalists

Results

Heats
Held on 2 September

Wind:Heat 1: ? m/s, Heat 2: -1.4 m/s, Heat 3: -3.6 m/s, Heat 4: -2.1 m/s

Semifinals
Held on 3 September

Wind:Heat 1: -0.1 m/s, Heat 2: -0.4 m/s

Final
Held on 3 September

Wind: +0.4 m/s

References

Athletics at the 1985 Summer Universiade
1985